Erenna is a genus of cnidarians belonging to the family Erennidae.

The species of this genus are found in Europe and Northern America and Southeast Asia.

Species:

Erenna cornuta 
Erenna insidiator 
Erenna laciniata 
Erenna richardi 
Erenna sirena

References

Erennidae
Hydrozoan genera